Danil Kutuzov (born 13 March 1987) is a Russian futsal player who plays for MFK Dina Moskva and the Russian national futsal team.

Biography
Daniil is a graduate of the Rudnenskiy futsal. At the start of his career he was playing for Glazov "Progress" in the Premier League. In the Super League he debuted for "Lipetsk" in 2006, soon he became one of team leaders. In December 2008, due to financial problems of the Lipetsk club he moved to "Mytishchi". Before the start of the 2012/13 season he was invited to the Moscow club "Dina", where he first won the national championship.

In 2008, Kutuzov won the first European Youth League. In the final game Daniel scored a goal. He also played for the adult national Russian team and took part in several exhibition games.

Achievements
 European Youth League Winner (1): 2008
 Russian Futsal Championship Winner (1): 2014

References

External links
MFK Dina Moskva profile
UEFA profile
AMFR profile 

1987 births
Living people
Russian men's futsal players
MFK Dina Moskva players